Subiaco may refer to:

Subiaco, Arkansas, a town in the United States
Subiaco Abbey (Arkansas), a Benedictine monastery
 Subiaco Academy, operated by the abbey
Subiaco, Lazio, a town in Italy, site of St. Benedict's first monastery
Subiaco, Western Australia, suburb of Perth
Subiaco Oval, a sports stadium
Subiaco Football Club
City of Subiaco, a local government municipality in Perth, Western Australia centred on the suburb of the same name
Subiaco Creek, a watercourse in Sydney, Australia.